Virginia Department of Rail and Public Transportation (VDRPT) is an agency of the  Commonwealth of Virginia in the United States.

According to its web site, the state agency's mission is "to improve the mobility of people and goods while expanding transportation choices in the Commonwealth."

The three primary areas of VDRPT activity are the state's railroads, public transportation, and commuter services. 
  
The Department of Rail and Public Transportation is a state agency reporting to the Virginia Secretary of Transportation and the Commonwealth Transportation Board. It was formerly a section within the Virginia Department of Transportation, (VDOT) (which continues to be responsible for most highways and related facilities such as ferry systems, bridges, tunnels, and two of the state's three bridge-tunnels). In 1992, the General Assembly established DRPT as a department.

As a now-separate agency, VDRPT still works closely with VDOT, as well as other state transportation agencies responsible for aviation and ports.

VDRPT operates the Virginia Breeze intercity bus service.

See also 
Transportation in Virginia

References

External links 

Virginia Department of Rail and Public Transportation website

Transportation in Virginia
State agencies of Virginia